Dawn House School (commonly referred to as Dawn House) is a specialist school run by the charity I CAN for children with severe or complex communication difficulties or Asperger’s Syndrome. It is in Rainworth, Nottinghamshire in the United Kingdom. 

It is a mixed school accommodating both residential and day pupils from ages of 5–19 years old.

History
Dawn House was opened by the charity I CAN in 1974 to support children aged 5–11 years old with speech and language disorders. In 1988, the school opened a secondary department to accommodate for children between the ages of 11–16 years old. In 2006, Dawn House opened a further education department for sixth form students.

Specialisms
Pupils with severe speech, language and communication needs (SLCN) or Asperger’s Syndrome can be referred to the specialist school. Pupils are referred when they have severe and complex needs, which cannot be met in local mainstream schools, units for pupils with language impairments or other special schools.

Dawn House is also able cater for a number of other difficulties that are typically associated with SLCN. These include: learning difficulties, behavioural modulation, problems with attention and memory, motor dyspraxia, sensory difficulties, autistic spectrum difficulties, emotional problems, difficulties with friendships and social relationships, poor self-image and low self-esteem.

School

Dawn House has 96 places for boys and girls aged between 5–19 years old and has a mixture of day pupils and residential students that board on a weekly basis. The school has a range of on-site facilities including an art and design technology suite, a drama studio, ICT suites, a sports hall, indoor heated swimming pool and outdoor playing fields.

External links
I CAN Dawn House School website
Ofsted Short Report April 2018

Special schools in Nottinghamshire
Educational institutions established in 1974
1974 establishments in England
Private schools in Nottinghamshire